Xolalgidae is a family of mites belonging to the order Sarcoptiformes.

Genera

Genera:
 Analloptes Trouessart, 1885
 Beaucournuella Gaud, 1974
 Cacatualges Dabert, Badek & Skoracki, 2007

References

Sarcoptiformes